Marie Lilian Vibbert (born 1974) is a science fiction author.

Background 
Vibbert was born in East Cleveland, Ohio in 1974, the daughter of a construction worker who was also a professional sculptor and painter. She has a twin sister named Grace.

She received a bachelor's degree in Geology and English from Case Western Reserve University in 1998. She played as a lineman in professional women's football for the Cleveland Fusion team.
She works as a programmer at the Freedman Center for Digital Scholarship through University Technology.

Vibbert attended the Clarion Science Fiction Writers' Workshop in 2013. and is a member of the Cleveland-based Cajun Sushi Hamsters writing workshop, and an organizer for the Cleveland Game Developers group. She lives with her husband Brian Crick in Cleveland Heights, Ohio.

She, and her twin, are both long-time active members in the Society for Creative Anachronism's Middle Kingdom where Marie Vibbert is known as  Lyonnete Vibert. She researches and teaches on topics of the arts, customs and culture of the Middle Ages.

Writing

Fiction
While she published an early short story, "Brain Trust" in the online magazine Reflection's Edge in February 2006, her significant body of short fiction started to appear after 2013. Her work has appeared in science fiction magazines including Analog Science Fiction, The Magazine of Fantasy and Science Fiction, Daily Science Fiction, and Clarkesworld, and has been reprinted in several anthologies. Her work has been called "the embodiment of what science fiction should be in 2016" by The Oxford Culture Review.

Her debut science fiction novel, Galactic Hellcats appeared in 2021, and was longlisted for the British Science Fiction Association' BSFA Award for 2021. Reviews of the book called it "Tongue-in-cheek humor, delightfully absurd (if sometimes over the top) action, and heartening themes of found family keep the pages turning" (Publishers Weekly) and "An interplanetary biker-squad romp that’s less cheesy than the Russ Meyer–esque premise suggests"  (Kirkus Reviews).

A fantasy novel The Gods Awoke appeared in August, 2022.  She also co-authored a thriller MegaDeath with Tory Quinn,<ref>Quinn, Tory, with Vibbert, Marie, MegaDeath, Level 4 Press. </ref> appearing in 2022.

 Poetry 
Vibbert's poetry has appeared in multiple publications, including Asimov's Science Fiction, Illumen, Star*Line, Utopia Science Fiction, Eye to the Telescope, Abyss & Apex, Dreams & Nightmares, Gathering Storm, and Kaleidotrope. Her poems have been nominees for the Rhysling award for science fiction poetry in 2016, 2021, and 2022.

 Scholarship
Vibbert has presented scholarly research on the subjects of women's headgear of the late Middle Ages,Vibbert, Marie  (August 2006). "Headdresses of the 14th and 15th Centuries", The Compleat Anachronist, SCA monograph series No. 133. (within the Society for Creative Anachronism), on class issues in science fiction, and on the statistical analysis of female writers of science fiction short stories.Vibbert, Marie (November–December 2020). "The Women We Can See in Analog," Analog Science Fiction and Fact,  volume 140, issue 11-12 pp. 98ff.

 Awards 
"Keep Talking" won the 2014 Apex Magazine Story of the Year.
"The Willing Body, the Reluctant Heart" placed second in the Analog Science Fiction "Analytical Laboratory" reader's poll in 2018.
"The Unlikely Heroines of Callisto Station" placed second in the Analog Science Fiction "Analytical Laboratory" reader's poll in 2021.

 Bibliography 

 Novels 
 Galactic Hellcats (2021)
 The Gods Awoke (2022)
 MegaDeath, with Tory Quinn (2022)

 Poetry 

List of poems

References

External links
 Official Website
 
 Marie Vibbert entry in The Encyclopedia of Science Fiction''
 
 Goodreads author page

1974 births
Living people
20th-century American novelists
20th-century American short story writers
21st-century American novelists
21st-century American short story writers
American science fiction writers
Asimov's Science Fiction people
Novelists from Ohio
People from Cleveland
Case Western Reserve University alumni